Orthadenella is a genus of mites in the family Ascidae.

Species
 Orthadenella lawrencei (Evans, 1957)

References

Ascidae